Sete or SETE might refer to:

 Sète, a commune in Languedoc-Roussillon, France
 SETE Linhas Aéreas, a domestic airline in Brazil
 Association of Greek Tourism Enterprises (SETE)
 Bola Sete, a Brazilian guitarist
 Sete (song), a 2022 song by K.O

See also

 Sette (disambiguation)
 Seti (disambiguation)
 Set (disambiguation)